The Haunting of Alma Fielding: A True Ghost Story is a 2021 book by Kate Summerscale that examines the workings of Nandor Fodor in 1930s London.

References

2021 non-fiction books
Penguin Press books
English-language books